The 1854 Atlantic hurricane season featured five known tropical cyclones, three of which made landfall in the United States. At one time, another was believed to have existed near Galveston, Texas in September, but HURDAT – the official Atlantic hurricane database – now excludes this system. The first system, Hurricane One, was initially observed on June 25. The final storm, Hurricane Five, was last observed on October 22. These dates fall within the period with the most tropical cyclone activity in the Atlantic. No tropical cyclones during this season existed simultaneously. One tropical cyclone has a single known point in its track due to a sparsity of data.

Of the season's five tropical cyclones, three reached hurricane status. Furthermore, one of those strengthened into a major hurricane, which is Category 3 or higher on the modern-day Saffir–Simpson hurricane wind scale. The strongest cyclone of the season, the third hurricane, peaked at Category 3 strength with  winds. After making landfall near the Georgia-South Carolina border, the storm caused 26 fatalities and extensive damage in the area. Hurricane Four caused four deaths and approximately $20,000 (1854 USD) in damage after striking the coast of Texas. Hurricane One also caused moderate damage in Texas.



Timeline

Systems

Hurricane One

It headed westward and strengthened into a hurricane about 12 hours later. It quickly weakened inland and fell to tropical storm strength about six hours later. The system continued in a west-northwestward direction over northern Mexico, until dissipating in a rural area of Coahuila on June 27.

This system brought near tropical storm-force winds to Texas as far north as Galveston. Brazos Island experienced the brunt of this storm, where winds blew a "perfect hurricane". Many buildings in the area lost their roofs or were moved by the winds. Additionally, a cistern at the Quartermaster's Department was destroyed. The coast of Texas was also impacted by storm surge, with several bath houses washed away at Lavaca.

Tropical Storm Two

No further information is available of this storm. However, the barque Pilgrim experienced a severe gale on August 29, which may have been the extratropical remnants of this system.

Hurricane Three

 The Coastal Hurricane of 1854 or The South Carolina Hurricane of 1854 closely duplicated the path of the famous 1804 Antigua–Charleston hurricane. It moved northwestward and weakened slightly on September 8. Early on September 9, it weakened to a Category 1 hurricane, then a tropical storm several hours later. Thereafter, the storm accelerated northeastward and re-emerged into the Atlantic Ocean near Virginia Beach, Virginia on September 10. The system re-strengthened, becoming a hurricane again on September 11.

Gales were reported in Florida, including as far south as St. Augustine. In Georgia, the entire coast suffered significant impacts, with damage more severe from St. Simons northward. About  of rice crops were destroyed, equivalent to a loss of approximately 6,000 bushels. Between Savannah, Georgia and Charleston, South Carolina, "extraordinary tides" were reported. Hutchinson Island, Georgia was completely submerged, while there was significant inundation in eastern Savannah. Storm surge also brought coastal flooding to much of South Carolina, from Beaufort to Georgetown. Wind damage in that area was mainly confined to downed trees. However, in Charleston, South Carolina, a two-story wooden building was destroyed and there was slight to moderate damage to other structures, limited to roofs and the destruction of fences. This hurricane compared similarly to hurricanes that struck Charleston in 1752, 1783, 1804, 1811, and 1822 in flooding and strength. Throughout the United States, this storm resulted in at least 26 fatalities.

Hurricane Four

The Matagorda Hurricane of 1854

At 2100 UTC on September 18, the storm made landfall near Freeport, Texas at the same intensity. It weakened to a Category 1 hurricane early on the following day. The system further weakened to a tropical storm at 1200 UTC on September 19. Re-curving northeastward, the storm persisted until dissipating over eastern Texas on September 20.

The steamship Louisiana reported that a gale struck Matagorda, Texas with "unparalleled fury", with nearly all buildings and vessels in the area destroyed. Several vessels also capsized near Galveston, including the Nick Hill and Kate Ward. Within the city of Galveston, merchants, businesses, and houses suffered significant water damage due to an  storm surge. Cotton and sugar cane crops throughout the area were ruined. The storm caused at least four deaths, with several more occurring later due to a yellow fever outbreak. Damage in the region totaled approximately $20,000.

Tropical Storm Five

The storm then began to re-curve northeastward. Early on October 22, it passed near Bermuda, though no impact was reported on the island.

References

Atlantic hurricane seasons
 
Hurricanes
1854 meteorology